The 2013 Akron Zips men's soccer team represented the University of Akron during the 2013 NCAA Division I men's soccer season. The Zips enter the season as the defending MAC Regular Season and Tournament champions.

Background

Competitions

Preseason

Regular season

MAC Standings

Results summary

Match reports

References 

2013 Mid-American Conference men's soccer season
2013
American men's college soccer teams 2013 season
Akron Zips